An oblong is a non-square rectangle. 

Oblong may also refer to:

Places
 Oblong, Illinois, a village in the United States
 Oblong Township, Crawford County, Illinois, United States
 A strip of land on the New York-Connecticut border in the United States nicknamed the "Oblong", running north from the Connecticut panhandle

Other uses
 Oblong (company), an American a cloud-based communication service provider 
 Oblong Industries, a spin-off of the MIT Media Lab
 Angus Oblong, American author and actor born David Walker (born 1976)
 The Oblongs, a short-lived 2001 American animated television program co-created by Angus Oblong
 Bob Oblong, a character in The Shapies, an Australian computer-animated children's television series
 Oblong, a leaf shape